S cells are cells which release secretin, found in the jejunum and duodenum. They are stimulated by a drop in pH to 4 or below in the small intestine's lumen. The released secretin will increase the secretion of bicarbonate (HCO3−) into the lumen, via the pancreas. This is primarily accomplished by an increase in cyclic AMP that activates CFTR to release chloride anions into the lumen. The luminal Cl− is then involved in a bicarbonate transporter protein exchange, in which the chloride is reabsorbed by the cell and HCO3− is secreted into the lumen. S cells are also one of the main producers of cyclosamatin.

Human cells
Digestive system